The 1974 Railway Cup Hurling Championship was the 48th staging of the Railway Cup since its establishment by the Gaelic Athletic Association in 1927. The cup began on 27 January 1974 and ended on 18 March 1974.

Leinster were the defending champions.

On 18 March 1974, Leinster won the cup following a 2-15 to 1-11 defeat of Munster in the final. This was their 15th Railway Cup title overall and their fourth title in succession.

Results

Preliminary round

Semi-finals

Final

Scoring statistics

Top scorers in a single game

Bibliography

 Donegan, Des, The Complete Handbook of Gaelic Games (DBA Publications Limited, 2005).

References

Railway Cup Hurling Championship
Railway Cup Hurling Championship
Hurling